The M4 High-Speed Tractor for World War II was an artillery tractor used by the US Army from 1943.

Design and development
The M4 High Speed Tractor used M4 Sherman tracks, roadwheels and drive sprocket.
One variant was designed to tow the 90 mm anti-aircraft gun, and another was for the 155 mm gun or 8-inch howitzer. The rear compartment carried the gun crew and other equipment and some later variants included a crane to assist with heavier projectiles. Two types of ammunition boxes were used on all models: a 90 mm box with side "tailgates" to access 90 mm shells pigeon-holed in the sides, and a combination box for 155 mm or 8-inch ammunition.

History

The M4 was built by tractors manufacturer Allis-Chalmers of  West Allis, Wisconsin, starting in 1943 and was in U.S. military service until approximately 1960. After WWII, under the US Mutual Defense Assistance Program, M4s was supplied to Greece, the Netherlands, Japan, Brazil, Yugoslavia and Pakistan and several other states friendly to the USA. In the Indo-Pakistani War of 1965 the Pakistani Army used M4 Tractors to haul their M115 Howitzers to the battlefield of Chamb and then to the front at Lahore during the fighting with Indian troops.

Variants
 M4: base model. 2,464 were configured to tow the 90 mm antiaircraft gun, while 3,088 were configured to tow the 155 mm gun or 8-inch howitzer
 M4C: The "C" designation indicates spare ammunition racks configured in the crew compartment.
 M4A1: The "A1" modification designates the wider suspension used for the "duck bill" tracks mirroring the E9 modification on Sherman tanks. 259 were built in 1945, and were used post-war as a prime mover for the M23 ammunition trailer in M40 Gun Motor Carriage sections.

Civilian use
After the war many types of these tractors were stripped of their military components and used for log skidders and power line construction. Many were used as carriers for rock drills, used in logging road construction in British Columbia. The first prototype was designed in the early 1960s by G.M. Philpott Ltd. of Vancouver, BC, and Scott-Douglas Industries, who supplied the M4 Carrier. It was used by MacMillan, Bloedel, and Powell River Company at their Juskatla, BC logging operation. Many improvements were made and when Finning Tractor later bought G.M. Philpott, the machine became the Finning Tank Drill. At least 500 were built, many of which are still in service. The original Finning Tank Drill was replaced by the M32F and M40F Tank Drills, which used larger Sherman tank carriers.
At Amsterdam Airport Schiphol in the Netherlands, at least two refurbished M4s were used by the airport fire brigade in the 1960s and '70s.

Surviving vehicles

 Robert Gill Collection militarymuseum.at, Vienna, Austria
 Armed Forces Military Museum, Largo, Florida.2 pieces in the Robert Gill Collection militarymuseum.at, Vienna Austria 
 Fort Sill Museum, Oklahoma. 
 Gunfire Museum, Brasschaat, Belgium. 
 National Military Museum in Soesterberg, The Netherlands. 
 Batey ha-Osef Museum, Tel Aviv, Israel. 
 Heartland Museum of Military Vehicles in Lexington, Nebraska. 
 Marshall Museum in Lexington, Virginia. 
 private collection in Colorado. 
 private collection in Gettysburg, Pennsylvania. 
 private collection in Grand Prairie, Texas. 
 private collection in Leicestershire, UK. 
 Royal Dutch Army historical collection Maaldrift, The Netherlands. 
 private collection in Molsheim, France. 
 private collection in O'Neill, Nebraska. 
 private collection in Orlando, Florida. 
 private collection in Troyes, France.
private collection in The National Military Vehicle Museum, South Australia
private collection in Sydney Australia as of April 2022

See also
 List of U.S. military vehicles by supply catalog designation (G150)
 List of U.S. military vehicles by model number
 M5 Tractor
 M6 Tractor
 Raupenschlepper, Ost

References
Notes

Bibliography

 
 TM 9-785 18-Ton High Speed Tractors M4, M4A1, M4C, M4A1C
 SNL G150
 the Field Artillery Journal, September 1945 references the M4A1 as an ammunition hauller for M40 Gun sections.

External links

 AA battery on display

Artillery tractors
Military vehicles of the United States
Allis-Chalmers Manufacturing Company
World War II vehicles of the United States
Military vehicles introduced from 1940 to 1944